The Toronto Club is a private business and social club in Toronto, Ontario, Canada.  Founded in 1837 (March 20), it is the oldest private club in Canada, and third oldest in North America.

The clubhouse, located at 107 Wellington Street West (at York Street), was designed by Frank Darling and S. George Curry in 1888, and opened in 1889. The building had additions and alterations between 1911 and 1912 by Darling and Pearson. The building mixes different architectural styles and marks an important transition in Darling's career.  The clubhouse was recognized as a heritage property by the City of Toronto in 1984 and by the Ontario Heritage Foundation in 2002.

Membership at the Toronto Club is by invitation only and is completely gender-neutral.  The Club is strictly for members and their invited guests.

The clubhouse is a 40,000 square foot, three-storey building.  The facilities include four lounges, a formal à la carte dining room, a cocktail bar, business centre and five private dining rooms.  The Club’s rooms are appointed and furnished.

The Club provides reciprocal privileges with a collection of clubs in the United States.

The Club offers its members a programme of special events including: four annual wine dinners featuring rare wines from its extensive cellar; regularly scheduled wine educational events; annual art dinners; an Annual Black-Tie Members’ Dinner at which a different distinguished member is honoured each year; high-profile guest speaker events; and a spectacular Christmas Buffet Luncheon.

See also
 List of gentlemen's clubs in Canada

References

External links

 Toronto Club website
 Ontario Heritage Trust – Plaques Database

Buildings and structures in Toronto
City of Toronto Heritage Properties
Clubs and societies based in Toronto
Culture of Toronto
Gentlemen's clubs in Canada